Talia Zucker is an Australian actress.

Biography
She played the role of Claire Jardine in the ABC series Dirt Game with Joel Edgerton and Gerald Lepkowski in 2009. Talia appeared as a guest character in the Australian drama series City Homicide and played a lead role in the children's series Scooter: Secret Agent and Legacy of the Silver Shadow. 

She played the recurring role of Erin Perry in the Australian soap opera Neighbours in 2003 and appeared in the popular Australian series Blue Heelers. Talia played the role of Louisa Von Trapp in the Australia tour of The Sound of Music starring Lisa McCune and John Waters. She appears as Sarah Wicks in the film Ned Kelly starring Heath Ledger. 

In 2008, Talia appears as the central character of Alice Palmer in the film Lake Mungo directed by Joel Anderson.

In 2018 she directed her first short film.

Filmography

Series

References

External links

1989 births
Living people
Australian film actresses
Australian television actresses